is a Japanese football player.

Playing career
Muto was born in Chiba Prefecture on May 9, 1995. After graduating from Hosei University, he joined J2 League club Matsumoto Yamaga FC in 2018. On June 6, he debuted against Roasso Kumamoto in Emperor's Cup.

References

External links

1995 births
Living people
Hosei University alumni
Association football people from Chiba Prefecture
Japanese footballers
J2 League players
Matsumoto Yamaga FC players
Association football defenders